Sergio Gonzalez (born October 18, 1947 in Hawthorne, California) is an American former wrestler who competed in the 1972 Summer Olympics.

References

1947 births
Living people
Olympic wrestlers of the United States
Wrestlers at the 1972 Summer Olympics
American male sport wrestlers
Pan American Games medalists in wrestling
Pan American Games gold medalists for the United States
Wrestlers at the 1971 Pan American Games
Medalists at the 1971 Pan American Games
20th-century American people
21st-century American people